William Bodkin  may refer to:
 Sir William Bodkin (judge) (1791–1874), British judge and Conservative Party politician
 Sir William Bodkin (New Zealand politician) (1885–1964), New Zealand politician of the United Party, and from 1935, the National Party